The 2022–23 season is the 109th season in the existence of Harrogate Town Association Football Club and the club's third consecutive season in League Two. In addition to the league, they will also compete in the 2022–23 FA Cup, the 2022–23 EFL Cup and the 2022–23 EFL Trophy.

Transfers

In

Out

Loans in

Loans out

Pre-season and friendlies
On 8 June, Harrogate Town announced their first set of pre-season fixtures.

Competitions

Overall record

League Two

League table

Results summary

Results by round

Matches

On 23 June, the league fixtures were announced.

FA Cup

Town were drawn away to Bradford City in the first round and to the winners off Solihull Moors versus Hartlepool United in the second round.

EFL Cup

Harrogate were drawn at home to Stockport County in the first round.

EFL Trophy

On 23 June, the group stage draw was finalised.

Notes

References

Harrogate Town
Harrogate Town A.F.C. seasons